What's with Andy? (Sacré Andy ! in French) is an animated children's television series loosely based on the semi-autobiographical Just! book series by Australian author Andy Griffiths. The animated series was primarily produced by Canadian animation studio CinéGroupe and broadcast on Teletoon, with various Disney-affiliated foreign studios and networks involved in the production of individual seasons.

The main character is Andy Larkin, a mischievous teen and the self-proclaimed "world's greatest prankster". The show follows him as he tries to perform elaborate practical jokes, or pranks, on people in the fictional town of East Gackle. Andy's best friend, Danny Pickett, helps him out with almost every prank. His antagonists include his older sister, Jen Larkin, and the bullies Peter Lik and Andrew Leech. Andy has a crush on a girl named Lori Mackney and usually tries to impress her.

The first season of the series has an American cast of voice actors (except for Ian James Corlett who is Canadian) for the characters, and takes place in the United States. In the second and third seasons, all voice actors and screenwriters are Canadians, and the show is set in the Canadian Prairies. Throughout the series, Andy often breaks the fourth wall to address the audience, with the screen freezing in black and white in the first season – a distinctive feature of the show referred to as "Doodle Vision".

Characters

Andrew "Andy" Larkin
Andy is a teenager who loves to prank people as well as annoy his friends and family (especially his sister), but often gets into trouble. His best friend is Danny and he has a crush on Lori. His catchphrase is "Cheque, please!" His name comes from Andy Griffiths, whom he is based on.

Daniel "Danny" Tadeus Pickett
Andy's best friend and right-hand man, helping him out with countless pranks. His last name has always been Pickett. The name "Danny Pickett is taken directly from the Just books. It's revealed in The Unfortunate One, that Danny is an Aries.

Lori Mackney
Andy's crush but she is dismayed by his childishness due to his pranking. It is hinted that she returns Andy's feelings and dislikes Jen because Lori thinks that Jen abuses Andy. She wears a green tank top, blue skirt and flip-flops. She is known as "Lisa" in the books.

The Larkin family
 Mr. Al Larkin: Andy and Jen's father and Freida's husband who also used to be a prankster, known as "The Mystery Prankster", aka "The Mystery Prankster of East Gackle" (he hides this fact from his family). However, he was cured of pranking by school counselor, Mrs. Murphy.
 Mrs. Freida Larkin: Andy and Jen's mother and Al's wife. She knows nothing about her husband's past as a prankster.
 Jennifer "Jen" Larkin: Andy's older sister who is always cranky and irritable. She blames her younger brother Andy for almost everything and finds his pranks childish and unfunny. She is unaware of her father's past as a prankster.
 Spank Larkin: Andy's fat and lazy dog. Spank frequently yawns, especially after going for a walk. He also appears to have flatulence problems.
 Norman Larkin: Andy's grandfather and Al's father who is also a prankster, implying that the male side of the Larkin family comes from a long line of pranksters (apparently with the exception of Al, but in the episode "Mind Games" it was revealed that he also used to be a prankster, possibly even greater than his son or father).

Recurring/minor characters
 Teri: Jen's best friend.
 Jervis Coltrane: A Canadian French snob who has a crush on Lori Mackney and dreams of being the Prime Minister of Canada.
 Peter Lik and Andrew Leech: Peter and Andrew are Andy's and Danny's nemeses. They are usually referred to as Lik and Leech.
 Craig Bennett: Jen's crush and one of the best athletes of East Gackle.
 Martin Bonwick: He is a stereotypically nervous nerd who very often gets bullied.
 Victor "Vic" Muskowitz (Mush): The pizza delivery man of East Gackle who is a good friend of Andy and Danny and he sometimes helps them with pranks.
 Steve Rowgee Jr.: A dumb police officer who is the incompetent son of Steve Rowgee Sr.
 Steve Rowgee Sr.: A police officer who is an old man, who always commands Steve Rowgee Jr. (his son) and is nicknamed the Iron Fisted Maniac.
 Principal DeRosa: He is the bad-tempered principal of the school in East Gackle and the main antagonist who is obsessed with punishing Andy.
 Mr. Hutchins: One of the many teachers at East Gackle school, Andy likes to prank him more than the other teachers.
 Mayor Henry K. Roth: The mayor of East Gackle.
 Mayor Simms: Mayor of West Gackle and Mayor Henry K. Roth's rival.
 Clyde: The janitor of the school.
 Hazel Strinner: She has a crush on Andy and Lori's protecting friend.
 Louella Berman: Frieda's best friend.
 Mrs. Wibbles: Principal DeRosa's secretary.

Voice actors

Additional voices (first season only)
 Jodi Carlisle
 Tim Conway
 E. G. Daily
 Melissa Disney
 Jeannie Elias
 Barbara Goodson
 Melissa Greenspan 
 Jess Harnell
 Maurice LaMarche 
 André Sogliuzzo
 Kath Soucie
 Jim Ward

Episodes

Production
The show is based on Andy Griffiths' children's series of Just! books (which were illustrated by Terry Denton), although many episodes are not directly based on the books. Changes from the books to the TV series include Andy's last name, which was originally that of his creator, and other minor name changes, such as Lori's name being Lisa in the books. The book series was based on the early life of Andy Griffiths.

It was originally an interactive Flash movie with completely different voice actors and a promotion for Fox Kids. A TV adaptation was announced by CinéGroupe on March 23, 2001 for broadcast on Teletoon and Fox Family later on in the year. Saban Entertainment participated in production and held distribution rights (Saban International).

The main production of the series moved to Canada in season 2, which was co-produced with the French studio SIP Animation (itself split from Saban Entertainment) and in association with German channel Super RTL. All the voice cast had to be replaced with this move with the exception of Andy Larkin's voice actor Ian James Corlett, as he was Canadian himself. As Saban Entertainment had by then been acquired by Disney, distribution of this season was handled by Disney subsidiary Buena Vista International Television.

In September 2003, the voice of Lori in Season 2, Jaclyn Linetsky, who also played the title character on Caillou, Meg in Mega Babies, and Megan O’ Connor in 15/Love, died in a traffic collision during production. She had managed to finish all of Season 2 prior to her death, but for the following season she was replaced by Eleanor Noble.

Season 3 was a collaboration between CinéGroupe and Super RTL, and distributed by the production company directly. The whole series was later added to CinéGroupe distribution partner HG Distribution's catalogue.

Release

Broadcast
What's with Andy? originally aired on Teletoon in Canada. In Australia, where the books originated, it was broadcast on Fox Kids.

United States
In the United States, the series was first shown on September 22, 2001 on Fox Family Channel, later ABC Family. On January 17, 2005, it premiered on Toon Disney, which also had rights to the second but not the third season.

Europe
In Europe, the series was licensed to Fox Kids Europe, with television distribution serviced by Buena Vista International Television. The show aired on Fox Kids networks in the UK, France and Greece, with Super RTL in Germany and TF1 in France having free-TV rights at the time. By June 2003, plans for the series to air on Fox Kids in Central and Eastern Europe were announced, along with plans for a free-TV expansion for the series, with plans to pre-sell the series to Fox Kids in the Netherlands, Mediatrade in Italy, Antena 3 in Spain, SIC in Portugal and RTE in Ireland.

The show continued to air on the network after the rebranding as Jetix.

Home media

VHS
On April 8, 2003, CinéGroupe Star released a set of three VHS tapes called "Double Trouble"/"Sacré Délire", which featured an episode each from this show and The Kids from Room 402, alongside a music video from the Pig City tie-in album "Reggie and the Rashers". Volume 1 featured the episode "It Came from East Gackle", Volume 2 featured the episode "Just Stuffing", and Volume 3 featured the episode "Rhyme Time". The releases were sold in separate English and French versions, respectively.

DVD
All 26 episodes from season 1, as well as the first 7 episodes of season 2, were released on 10 DVD volumes with English audio in the Czech Republic in 2010.

The show was also released on DVD in other European countries, but only in the respective languages (i.e. without the original English audio). All of season 2 (and most of season 1) was released on DVD in Germany, and the entirety of season 1 was released on 5 DVD volumes in Russia.

Streaming
Season 3 was available on the Canadian YouTube channel Encore+ in both English and French until its shutdown in November 2022. This season was previously available in German on Kividoo.

Music
The three German-language theme songs for each season were released on Toggo music CDs volumes 4, 7, and 17 respectively by Sony Music, with the first and third-season songs being extended versions. The original English-language theme was also released on volume 2.

The soundtrack (including themes) from the first two seasons is distributed as production music by Red Brick Songs (formerly Casablanca Media Publishing) in Canada.

Reception
What's with Andy? received very high ratings in a number of countries.

On Teletoon in Canada, it was reported to be the second highest-rated original production as of October 2007. It also had about 40% market share in France (Fox Kids/TF1) and Germany as of 2003. The show won a fall 2002 Super RTL cartoon election poll with 60% of the vote, and obtained the second-highest ratings on the channel in July 2006.

References

External links
 

2000s American animated television series
2001 American television series debuts
2007 American television series endings
2000s Canadian animated television series
2001 Canadian television series debuts
2007 Canadian television series endings
2000s French animated television series
2001 French television series debuts
2007 French television series endings
Culture of Montreal
Television shows set in Alberta
American children's animated comedy television series
Canadian children's animated comedy television series
French children's animated comedy television series
American television shows based on children's books
Canadian television shows based on children's books
French television shows based on children's books
Fox Family Channel original programming
Teletoon original programming
Fox Kids
English-language television shows
Television series by Saban Entertainment
Animated television series about children